The 1958–59 Honduran Amateur League was the eleventh edition of the Honduran Amateur League. C.D. Olimpia obtained its 2nd national title.  The season ran from 23 March 1958 to 11 March 1959.

Regional champions

Known results

National championship round
Played in a double round-robin format between the regional champions.  Also known as the Pentagonal.  After their first two matches, C.D. Fortuna retired from the competition and their results were annulled.

Known results

Olimpia's lineup

References

Liga Amateur de Honduras seasons
Honduras
1958 in Honduras
1959 in Honduras